Clinidium excavatum is a species of ground beetle in the subfamily Rhysodinae. It was described by R.T. Bell & J.R. Bell in 1985. It is known from its type locality in Carabobo, northern Venezuela. Clinidium excavatum measure  in length.

References

Clinidium
Beetles of South America
Endemic fauna of Venezuela
Beetles described in 1985